Double Confession is a 1950 British crime film directed by Ken Annakin and starring Derek Farr, Joan Hopkins,  William Hartnell and Peter Lorre. The screenplay, written by William Templeton, is based on the novel, All On A Summer's Day by HLV Fletcher, written under the pen name "John Garden". It was made at the Teddington Studios of Warner Brothers in London with extensive location shooting in Bexhill-on-Sea and nearby Hastings in East Sussex. The film's sets were designed by the art director Bernard Robinson.

Double Confession is missing from the BFI National Archive, and is included on the British Film Institute's list of "75 Most Wanted". A complete 35mm print does exist in an independent archive in the UK. In February 2013, a restored edition was released on DVD by Renown Pictures in the UK; however, this DVD is no longer available.

Plot
Arriving late at night in the seaside town of Seagate, Jim Medway (Derek Farr) heads for his estranged wife's isolated coastal cottage. As he arrives, he sees prominent local businessman Charlie Durham (William Hartnell) coming out of the house, in which he then finds his wife dead. With the awareness that his wife had been having an affair with Durham, Medway embarks on attempts to blackmail the wealthy entrepreneur or get him arrested for murdering his wife. However, Durham's sinister homicidal sidekick Paynter (Peter Lorre) is out to protect his boss by arranging a little "accident" for Medway. As Inspector Tenby (Naunton Wayne) slowly gathers clues to solve the mystery, he begins to suspect there is a less obvious culprit.

Cast

 Derek Farr as Jim Medway
 Joan Hopkins as Ann Corday
 William Hartnell as Charlie Durham
 Peter Lorre as Paynter
 Naunton Wayne as Inspector Tenby
 Ronald Howard as Hilary Boscombe
 Kathleen Harrison as Kate
 Leslie Dwyer as Leonard
 Edward Rigby as the Fisherman
 George Woodbridge as Sergeant Swanton
 Henry Edwards as Man in the Shelter
 Mona Washbourne as Fussy Mother
 Vida Hope as Madam Zilia
 Esma Cannon as Madame Cleo
 Andrew Leigh as the Reserved Man
 Fred Griffiths as the Spiv
 Jane Griffith as First Girl
 Diana Connell as Second Girl
 Hal Osmond as Gallery Attendant
 Norman Astridge as Selby 
 Roy Plomley as Ticket Collector
 Jennifer Cross as Fussy Mother's Child	
 Betty Nelson as Girl at Shooting Gallery	
 Sidney Vivian as Ring Stall Attendant	
 Grace Denbeigh-Russell as Nosey Woman

Critical reception
In The New York Times, Bosley Crowther commented, "it rambles around in maddening fashion for what seems interminable hours while Naunton Wayne as a deadpanned detective tries to figure out who killed whom...It is all very odd and disconnected, especially when Peter Lorre pops in from time to time to behave like a degenerate and offer to kill anybody in the house"; while more recently Allmovie wrote, "The presence of Peter Lorre assured a modicum of American business for the British meller Double Confession...Lorre's role is largely peripheral, but he does supply a few moments of genuine menace"; while Sky Movies wrote, "Director Ken Annakin showed in an earlier film, Holiday Camp, that he liked to be beside the seaside. But, in this superior crime drama, he makes the resort of 'Seagate' appear a very sinister place indeed. The whodunnit plot benefits enormously from Peter Lorre's almost apologetic menace"; and The Digital Fix concluded, "it’s an excellent piece of work. Tightly constructed, exceptionally well-performed and with a wonderful sense of place, Double Confession deserves to find an enthusiastic audience."

References

External links
BFI 75 Most Wanted entry, with extensive notes

1950 films
1950 crime films
British crime films
British black-and-white films
Films directed by Ken Annakin
Films scored by Benjamin Frankel
Films set in England
1950s rediscovered films
Rediscovered British films
1950s English-language films
1950s British films
Films shot in East Sussex
Films based on British novels
Films shot at Teddington Studios